FK Lisović is a Serbian football club based in Lisović, Serbia.

History
Football has been played in Lisovic since 1937. Then the teachers Jelace gathered some village boys and taught them rules of this game in the field of Bogosav Stanisavljevic, with the leather ball which was made by shoemaker Gose. In 2008 club achieved greatest success, by promoting to Srpska Liga Belgrade. There Lisović played one season, but in summer 2009 they step down from the competition, so FK Resnik took their place.

Football clubs in Serbia
1977 establishments in Serbia
Association football clubs established in 1977
Barajevo